Blackbird is a 2007 American drama film directed and written by Adam Rapp and starring Gillian Jacobs, Paul Sparks, and Danny Hoch. It was adapted from a play written by Rapp.

It debuted at South by Southwest and went on to screen at the Edinburgh Film Festival and the Charlotte Film Festival, where it won "Best Narrative Feature".

Plot 
In 1990s New York City, teen runaway and stripper Froggy is caught in the throes of heroin addiction as she falls in love with a fellow junkie, war veteran Baylis. The couple finds comfort in each other, yet they are already far too deep in a wild downward spiral. The possibility of redemption arises, with hope for some semblance of a "normal life", but Bayliss and Froggy are unable to find the strength and control to clean themselves up. Their path leads inexorably toward mutual self-destruction.

Cast 
 Gillian Jacobs as Froggy
 Paul Sparks as Baylis
 Danny Hoch as Pinchback
 Michael Shannon as Murl
 Annie Parisse as Angie
 Stephen Adly Guirgis as Mercado
 Anthony Katagas as Close
 Danny Mastrogiorgio as Kent

Critical reception 
Screen Daily said the "film treads a well-worn path", but the "superb performances of Jacobs and Sparks keep the viewer going for a long while."

References

External links 
 Blackbird at Moviefone
 

2007 films
2007 drama films
American drama films
2000s English-language films
2000s American films

American films based on plays
Films about heroin addiction
Films about runaways
Films set in the 1990s
Films set in 1995
2007 independent films
American independent films